The Thomas F. Doran Three-Decker is an historic three-decker in Worcester, Massachusetts.  The wood-frame building was built c. 1894, and is one a few well-preserved Stick style three-deckers in the city.  The house was listed on the National Register of Historic Places in 1990.

Description and history
The Thomas F. Doran Three-Decker is located in a densely built residential area west of downtown Worcester, on the south side of John Street between North Ashland and Wesby Streets.  It is a three-story wood-frame structure, with a mostly clapboarded exterior.  It has molding strips between the floors, and a hip roof with bracketed eaves.  The front facade has a projecting square bay whose gable end contains spindle woodwork in a sunburst pattern.  The porch is also decorated with a spindled frieze and brackets.  Its sash windows are framed by bracketed sills and lintels.

The house was built about 1894, during a westward push of triple-decker development in the city which began to penetrate into the more fashionable and upper-class western residential parts of the city.  Early residents were typically Irish, and either white-collar or skilled blue-collar laborers.  Thomas Doran, its first owner, was stage manager at a local theater, and also owned an adjacent house. Early tenants included a laborer and a gas station operator.

See also
National Register of Historic Places listings in northwestern Worcester, Massachusetts
National Register of Historic Places listings in Worcester County, Massachusetts

References

Apartment buildings in Worcester, Massachusetts
Apartment buildings on the National Register of Historic Places in Massachusetts
Queen Anne architecture in Massachusetts
Houses completed in 1894
National Register of Historic Places in Worcester, Massachusetts